Jury fees refer to the daily stipend paid to jurors. The source of these fees varies according to the kind of trial. Government pays the fees in criminal trials, while the litigants share the costs in a civil action as part of court costs. Not infrequently, the entire burden of court costs may be shifted to the loser of a civil action. A deposit of one day's fees may be required in advance of the trial by the litigant requesting the presence of a jury.

Example: California
California's jury fee provisions appear at Code of Civil Procedure section 215 and Code of Civil Procedure Sections 631-636.  Here are notable excerpts:

References

Legal costs
Juries